Christchurch Bridge, originally known as the Reading Pedestrian and Cycle Bridge, is a pedestrian and cycle bridge over the River Thames at Reading in the English county of Berkshire. The bridge links the centre of Reading on the south bank with the cross-river suburb, and former village, of Caversham on the north bank.

Design
The bridge was designed by Design Engine Architects in collaboration with engineers Peter Brett Associates, and opened on 30 September 2015. The bridge won a commendation in the 2016 Civic Trust Awards.

The cable-stayed bridge has a  river span, which is supported by 14 pairs of cables from a  mast that is asymmetrically placed on the north bank of the river. The walkway and mast are illuminated by 234 LED lights, of which 39 can be programmed to change colour.

Name
The original bridge name was a working name, and Reading Borough Council held a competition for a permanent name. The new name was confirmed as Christchurch Bridge at a council meeting on 22 March 2015. The name relates to Christchurch Meadows, the bridge's landing point in Caversham, which in turn is named after Christ Church in Oxford, whose dean owned  of farmland in Reading. The name also reflects more recent links between Reading and Christ Church, which was involved in the foundation of the University of Reading.

See also 
List of crossings of the River Thames

References

External links 
 
 Time-lapse video of the construction of the bridge at YouTube

Bridges across the River Thames
Bridges completed in 2015
Bridges in Reading, Berkshire
Cable-stayed bridges